Robert O'Handley (1942–2013) was a professor and research scientist in the Department of Materials Science and Engineering (DMSE) at the Massachusetts Institute of Technology. He received an MS and PhD at the New York University Tandon School of Engineering. O'Handley authored many books.

Bibliography

References

1942 births
2013 deaths
MIT School of Engineering faculty
Polytechnic Institute of New York University alumni